Gowna are a Gaelic football club based in the village of Loch Gowna, County Cavan, Ireland.

History
GAA has been present in the local Gowna area since as early as 1889 and the club went under the name of Scrabby West Breffnians or 'Breffnies' as they were otherwise known. Gowna's first major football success came in 1916 in the form of a junior championship. Gowna GFC, as we know it today, was officially reformed in 1976 and has gone through some major developmental change. The 'post reform' park was officially opened in 1982 and was revamped in 2011 to stand as it is today.

After reforming in 1976, Gowna claimed the Junior title in 1982 and won the Intermediate in 1985. Gowna reached the final of the Senior Championship in 1988, where they defeated Laragh United to claim the club's first senior title. They went on to win six more championships in 1994, 1996, 1997, 1999, 2000 and 2002. After a 20-year wait, in which they lost finals in 2007 and 2021, Gowna claimed their eighth senior crown in 2022.

After winning the Ulster Senior Football Championship in 1997, Gowna's Dermot McCabe became the second Cavan player to win an All Star.

In 2021, the club became the first GAA club to sell the naming rights of their club grounds, with the grounds being rebranded as 'ClubSpot Park'.

Honours
 Cavan Senior Football Championship: 8
 1988, 1994, 1996, 1997, 1999, 2000, 2002, 2022
 Cavan Intermediate Football Championship: 1
 1985
 Cavan Junior Football Championship: 3
 1916, 1934, 1982
 Cavan Under-21 Football Championship: 6
 1981, 1985, 1986, 1987, 2017*, 2021* (*Southern Gaels (Gowna/Lacken))
 Cavan Minor Football Championship: 6
 1958, 1983, 1984, 1985, 2014*, 2020* (*Southern Gaels (Gowna/Lacken))

Notable players
 Dermot McCabe
 Mark McKeever

References

External links
Gowna Official Website
Official Cavan GAA Website

Gaelic games clubs in County Cavan
Gaelic football clubs in County Cavan